Tar Township (تار تاجىك يېزىسى / Ta'er ) is a Mountain Tajik Ethnic Township of Akto County in Xinjiang Uygur Autonomous Region, China. Located in the southernmost part of the county, the township covers an area of 1,009.7 square kilometers with a population of 5,408 (as of 2015). It has 8 administrative villages under its jurisdiction. Its seat is at Bag Village .

Name

The name of Tar is from Sarikoli language, meaning "narrow". It was named for being located in a narrow river valley in the mountains.

Geography and resources
Tar is the southernmost township of Akto County and located in the western Kunlun Mountains. It is bordered by Qarlung Township to the north and east, by Taxkorgan County to the south and west. It has an area  of 1,009.7 square kilometers with the arable land area of 422.59 hectares. The seat of the township is away a road mileage of 420 kilometers from Akto Town. As of 2015, the township has 1,410 households with a population of 5,408.

Administrative divisions
The township has 8 administration villages and 12 unincorporated villages under its jurisdiction.

8 administration villages
 Akkum Village (Akekumu )
 Almalek Village (Alemaleke )
 Bag Village (Bage )
 Bagegiz Village (Bage'aigezi )
 Beldir Village (Bieledi'er )
 Hoxabati Village (Huoxi'abati )
 Kuzu Village
 Tarabati Village (Ta'er'abati )

 Unincorporated villages 
 Kengsaz

Demographics

References 

Township-level divisions of Akto County